Rhisnes is a suburb of the city of Namur, Wallonia, located in the province of Namur, Belgium.

The suburb is bounded on the north by the E42/A15 motorway (exit number 12 Namur-Ouest (Namur West)), to the east by the N904 road, and to the west by the N4 road. The dominant features in the suburb is the Namur-Nord-Rhisnes (Namur North Rhisnes) business park and the Ecolys park. The neighbouring old Suarlée Fort and park lands are just outside the suburb.
Geography of Namur (city)
Populated places in Namur (province)